Trinidad and Tobago first participated in the Summer Olympic Games in 1948, before they attained their independence from Great Britain. Despite being a small nation in the Caribbean, Trinidad and Tobago has been able to place themselves firmly in international sports. In 1946, Sir Lennox O’Reilly organized the nation’s first Olympic committee. Trinidad and Tobago have participated in sixteen Summer Olympiads and three Winter Olympics (as well as two Summer Paralympics).

Participation

Timeline of participation

Medal tables

Medals by Summer Games

Medals by Winter Games

Medals by sport

List of medalists

1948 Summer Olympics
The Games of the XIV Olympiad were held in 1948 in London, United Kingdom. This was the first time Trinidad & Tobago was represented in the Olympics. The Trinidad & Tobago Olympic Committee sent nine athletes and officials to represent the nation in three disciplines.

Errol Knowles was the Chef de Mission

Athletics
Three athletes and one official represented this discipline.
George Lewis- 100 m & 200 m
Manny Ramjohn- 500 m & 1000 m
Wilfred Tull- 800 m & 1500 m
A.E. Browne- Manager/Coach

Trinidad & Tobago did not win any medals in 1948 for this discipline.

Cycling
One athlete and one official represented this discipline.
Compton Gonsalves- Kilometer Time Trial
Laurie Rogers- Manager/Coach

Trinidad & Tobago did not win any medals in 1948 for this discipline.

Compton Gonsalves placed 17th in the kilometer time trial with a time of 1 minute and 32 seconds.

Weightlifting

One athlete and one official represented this discipline.

Rodney Wilkes- Featherweight
Lionel Seemungal- Manager/Coach

Rodney Wilkes won the first medal for Trinidad and Tobago lifting 317.5 kilograms in three lifts.

1952 Summer Olympics
The Games of the XV Olympiad were held in 1952 in Helsinki, Finland. This was the second time Trinidad & Tobago was represented in the Olympics. The Trinidad & Tobago Olympic Committee sent four athletes and officials to represent the nation in one discipline.

Errol Knowles was the Chef de Mission

Two athletes and one official represented this discipline.

Rodney Wilkes- Featherweight
Lennox Kilgour- Middle Heavy
Freddy Mendes- Coach

Both athletes won medals for Trinidad & Tobago. Rodney Wilkes lift 322.5 kilograms and Lennox Kilgour lift 402.5 kilograms.

1956 Summer Olympics
The Games of the XVI Olympiad were held in 1956 in Melbourne, Australia. This was the third time Trinidad & Tobago was represented in the Olympics. The Trinidad & Tobago Olympic Committee sent eight athletes and officials to represent the nation in one discipline.

Dr. Roderick Marcano was the Chef de Mission.

Athletics
Three athletes represented this discipline.

Mike Agostini - 100 m & 200 m
Joseph Goddard - 100 m & 200 m
Edmund Turton

Michael Agostini placed 6th in the 100 m and 4th in the 200 m.

Cycling
One athlete represented this discipline.

Hilton Mitchell- Match Sprint & Kolo Time Trial

Weightlifting
Two athletes and one official represented this discipline.

Lennox Kilgour- Middle Heavy
Rodney Wilkes- Featherweight
Alexander Chapman- Coach

Lennox Kilgour placed 6th. Rodney Wilkes placed 4th lifting 330 kilograms.

1960 Summer Olympics
The Games of the XVII Olympiad were held in 1960 in Rome, Italy.

In 1958 the West Indies joined together to become a Confederation. Because of this, a West Indian Team was entered in the Olympics. Trinidad and Tobago however contributed four athletes to the team.

Clifton Bertrand- Athletics
Clyde Rimple- Cycling
Richard Bennett- Sailing
David Farfan- Sailing

The British West Indies won two bronze medals, none of which were attributed to Trinidad & Tobago.

1964 Summer Olympics
The Games of the XVIII Olympiad were held in 1964 in Tokyo, Japan. This was the fourth time Trinidad & Tobago was represented in the Olympics. The Trinidad & Tobago Olympic Committee sent twenty athletes and officials to represent the nation in four disciplines.

Knolly Henderson was the Chef de Mission.

Athletics

Seven athletes and two official represented this discipline.

Kent Bernard- 4 × 400 m relay
Clifton Bertrand
Wilton Jackson
Wendell Mottley- 400 m & 4 × 400 m relay
Edwin Roberts- 200 m & 4 × 400 m relay
Edwin Skinner- 4 × 400 m relay
E. McDonald Bailey- Coach
Broderick Lynch- Manager

Edwin Roberts won bronze in the 200 m in 20.3 seconds. The men’s relay team also won bronze. Wendell Mottley won silver for the 400 m in 45.2 seconds.

Cycling
Three athletes and two official represented this discipline.

Ronald Cassidy- Track
Roger Gibbon- Track
Fitzroy Hoyte- Track
Gordon Carew- Coach
Compton Gonsalves- Mechanic

Sailing
Two athletes and one official represented this discipline.

Cordell Barrow- Flying Dutchman
Rawle Barrow- Flying Dutchman
Bob Levorsen- Coach

The sailing team placed 20th.

Weightlifting
Two athletes and one official represented this discipline.

Brandon Bailey- Heavyweight
Hugo Gittens- Lightweight
Alexander Chapman- Coach

Hugo Gittens placed 11th in the lightweight class with 367.5 kg (810 lb). Brandon Bailey placed 20th in the heavyweight division.

See also
 List of flag bearers for Trinidad and Tobago at the Olympics
 Trinidad and Tobago at the Paralympics
 Tropical nations at the Winter Olympics

References

External links

 
 
 
 Trinidad and Tobago National Olympic Committee
 "Trinidad and Tobago at the Olympics", Trinidad and Tobago government website